Antrim was a county constituency of the Parliament of Northern Ireland from 1921 to 1929. It returned seven MPs, using proportional representation by means of the single transferable vote.

Boundaries
Antrim was created by the Government of Ireland Act 1920 and consisted of the administrative County Antrim (that is, excluding those parts of the historic county within the County Borough of Belfast). The House of Commons (Method of Voting and Redistribution of Seats) Act (Northern Ireland) 1929 divided the constituency was divided into the seven constituencies elected under first past the post: Antrim Borough, Bann Side, Carrick, Larne, Mid Antrim, North Antrim and South Antrim constituencies.

Second Dáil
In May 1921, Dáil Éireann, the parliament of the self-declared Irish Republic run by Sinn Féin, passed a resolution declaring that elections to the House of Commons of Northern Ireland and the House of Commons of Southern Ireland would be used as the election for the Second Dáil. All those elected were on the roll of the Second Dáil, but as no Sinn Féin MP was elected for Antrim, it was not represented there.

Politics
Antrim had a Unionist majority, with some pockets of Nationalist support. In 1921, six Unionists and one Nationalist were elected, while in 1925, there were five unionists, one Nationalist and one member of the Unbought Tenants Association elected.

Members of Parliament

Election results

References

Northern Ireland Parliament constituencies established in 1921
Northern Ireland Parliament constituencies disestablished in 1929
Dáil constituencies in Northern Ireland (historic)
Constituencies of the Northern Ireland Parliament
Historic constituencies in County Antrim